Matt Greenberg is an American screenwriter and producer best known for his work on the horror films Halloween H20: 20 Years Later, 1408, and Pet Sematary (2019).

Filmography

References

External links
 
 

American film producers
American male screenwriters
Living people
Year of birth missing (living people)